Larrell Montale Murchison (born April 24, 1997) is an American football defensive end for the Los Angeles Rams of the National Football League (NFL). He played college football at NC State.

Early life and high school
Murchison grew up in Elizabethtown, North Carolina and attended East Bladen High School. He played defensive line and fullback on the football team while his twin brother, Farrell, played halfback. As a senior, he rushed for 545 yards and five touchdowns on offense and made 83 tackles on defense. He and Farrell both originally committed to play college football at Winston-Salem State, but ultimately they opted to enroll in junior college.

College career
Murchison began his collegiate career at Louisburg College. As a sophomore, he had 41 tackles, 17.5 tackles for loss and 5.5 sacks and was named an honorable mention Junior College All-American. He committed to transfer to  Ole Miss over offers from Georgia and Texas before flipping his commitment to North Carolina State late in the recruiting process.

Murchison redshirted his first season with the Wolfpack. He became a starter at defensive tackle going into his senior season and finished the year with 34 tackles, eight tackles for loss and four sacks. In his final season Murchison recorded 48 total tackles, 12 tackles for loss, seven sacks, two passes defended and two of fumble recoveries.

Professional career

Tennessee Titans

Murchison was selected in the fifth round of the 2020 NFL Draft with the 174th overall pick by the Tennessee Titans. On May 13, 2020, Murchison signed a four-year deal with the Titans and was the first of the Titans 2020 draft class to sign a rookie contract. Murchison made his NFL debut on September 20, 2020, against the Jacksonville Jaguars, making one tackle.

On October 1, 2021, Murchison was placed on injured reserve after suffering an elbow injury in Week 3. He was activated on October 23.

On August 30, 2022, Murchison was waived by the Titans and signed to the practice squad the next day. He was promoted to the active roster on November 15. He was waived again on December 10.

Los Angeles Rams
On December 12, 2022, Murchison was claimed off waivers by the Los Angeles Rams. He made the first two sacks of his NFL career during his Rams debut in a 51-14 victory over Denver on December 25, 2022.

References

External links
NC State Wolfpack bio
Tennessee Titans bio

1997 births
Living people
People from Elizabethtown, North Carolina
Players of American football from North Carolina
American football defensive tackles
Louisburg College alumni
NC State Wolfpack football players
Tennessee Titans players
Los Angeles Rams players